Brands Hatch Racing was a Formula One entrant in 1980. The team was also involved in sports car racing between 1980 and 1984.

Formula One
 Race: 1980 British Grand Prix
 Driver: Desiré Wilson
 Car manufacturer: Williams
 Engine manufacturer: Ford
 Tyre manufacturer: Goodyear
 Car model: Williams FW07
 Car number: 43
 Qualifying position: 27th. This position was not good enough to qualify for the race.

Sports car racing

References
 1980 Formula One season
 ChicaneF1.com
 Racing Sports Cars - Tiga
 Racing Sports Cars - Lola T610
 Desiré Wilson

Formula One entrants
British auto racing teams
Auto racing teams established in 1980
Auto racing teams disestablished in 1984